This is a list of works by Paul Goodman (1911–1972), including his nonfiction, novels, short stories, poetry, and plays.

Nonfiction

Books 

 Kafka's Prayer (1947)
 Communitas (1947, with Percival Goodman)
 Gestalt Therapy (1951, with Fritz Perls and Ralph Hefferline)
 The Structure of Literature (1954)
 Growing Up Absurd (1960)
 Utopian Essays and Practical Proposals (1962)
 The Community of Scholars (1962)
 Compulsory Miseducation (1964)
 People or Personnel (1965)
 Five Years (1966)
 Like a Conquered Province (1967)
 New Reformation (1970)
 Speaking and Language (1971)
 Little Prayers and Finite Experience (1972)
 Creator Spirit Come! The Literary Essays of Paul Goodman (1977)
 Drawing the Line: The Political Essays of Paul Goodman (1977)
 Nature Heals: The Psychological Essays of Paul Goodman (1977)
 Crazy Hope and Finite Experience: Final Essays of Paul Goodman (1994)

Fiction

Long fiction 

 The Empire City (1959)
 The Grand Piano: Or, The Almanac of Alienation (1942)
 The State of Nature (1946)
 The Dead of Spring (1950)
 The Holy Terror (1959)
 Parents' Day (1951)
 Making Do (1963)

Short fiction 

 The Facts of Life (1945)
 The Break-up of Our Camp, and Other Stories (1949)
 Our Visit to Niagara (1960)
 Adam and His Works (1968)
 The Collected Stories and Sketches of Paul Goodman (1977–1980, four volumes)

Plays 

 Jonah (1945)
 Faustina (1949)
 Childish Jokes: Crying Backstage (1951)
 The Young Disciple (1955)
 Tragedy and Comedy: Four Cubist Plays (1970)

Poetry 

 Stop-light: Five Dance Poems (1941)
 The Lordly Hudson: Collected Poems (1962)
 Hawkweed (1967)
 Homespun of Oatmeal Gray (1970)
 Collected Poems (1973)

Sources

External links 

 

Goodman, Paul